Judy L. Bonner is an American academic. She served as the President of the University of Alabama in Tuscaloosa, Alabama from 2012 to 2015.

Early life and family background
Judy L. Bonner was born in Wilcox County, Alabama. She graduated from the University of Alabama, where she received bachelor's and master's degrees. She received a PhD in Nutrition from Ohio State University in Columbus, Ohio.

Her brother, Jo Bonner, served as a Republican member of the United States House of Representatives from 2003 to 2013.

Career
Bonner started her career as a faculty member of the University of Alabama in 1981. She became the Dean of its College of Human Environmental Sciences in 1989. She became the Provost and Executive Vice President of the University of Alabama in 2003.

She served as the president of the University of Alabama from 2012 to 2015. She was its first female president.

References

Living people
People from Wilcox County, Alabama
University of Alabama alumni
Ohio State University College of Education and Human Ecology alumni
University of Alabama faculty
Presidents of the University of Alabama
Year of birth missing (living people)